Aguaviva or Aiguaiva de Bergantes is a municipality located in the province of Teruel, Aragon, Spain. According to the 2018 census (INE), the municipality had a population of 522 inhabitants.

It is known as Aiguaiva de Bergantes in the local Catalan variety because river Bergantes flows by the eastern end of the town.

See also
Bajo Aragón

References

External links
Aragonese Encyclopedia - Aguaviva

Municipalities in the Province of Teruel
Maestrazgo